The 2004 Individual Speedway European Championship

Qualification
Qualifying Round:
June 13, 2004
 Mseno
Semi-Final A:
June 27, 2004
 Lendava
Semi-Final B:
July 3, 2004
 Stralsund
Scandinavian Final (Semi-Final C):
May 23, 2004
 Elgane

Final
September 29, 2004
 Holsted

See also

2004
European I